QimiQ is a dairy product consisting of 99% light cream and 1% gelatine, patented by HAMA Foodservice GmbH.

The product was invented by Hans Mandl and Rudolf Haindl in 1995, and was designed to replace artificial emulsifiers and stabilizers by blending with liquids such as alcohol or vinegar; it also emulsifies with oil. QimiQ contains gelatine, which removes the need to soak gelatine sheets in liquid and then add them. It is stable when exposed to heat or mixed with acids or alcohol, and thus can be used in food products where milk products cannot be used.

Background
QimiQ is an Austrian company founded by Rudolf f. Haindl and Johann Mandl in 1995. QimiQ is available as "QimiQ Classic" (for cooking, baking and refining), "QimiQ Whip" (for whipping), and "QimiQ Sauce Base" (for sauces and soups).

The two ingredients are blended in a production process, which protects the sensitive milk protein with a coating of milk fat and then a thin layer of gelatine. This results in a finer structure which is more compact and stable.

The product won a 2002 Mercury Award from the International Travel Catering Association.

References

External links
www.qimiq.com

Dairy products